Salles-de-Belvès (literally Salles of Belvès) is a commune in the Dordogne department in Nouvelle-Aquitaine in southwestern France.

Population

See also
Communes of the Dordogne department

References

External links

 Webpage about Salles-de-Belvès 

Communes of Dordogne